Events from the year 1889 in the United States. Four states—North Dakota, South Dakota, Montana, and Washington—were created this year, making this the busiest year for state creation since 1788.

Incumbents

Federal Government 
 President: Grover Cleveland (D-New York) (until March 4), Benjamin Harrison (R-Indiana) (starting March 4)
 Vice President: vacant (until March 4), Levi P. Morton (R-New York) (starting March 4)
 Chief Justice: Melville Fuller (Illinois)
 Speaker of the House of Representatives: John G. Carlisle (D-Kentucky) (until March 4), Thomas Brackett Reed (R-Maine) (starting December 2)
 Congress: 50th (until March 4), 51st (starting March 4)

Events

January–March

 January 1 – A total solar eclipse is seen over parts of California and Nevada.
 January 4 – An Act to Regulate Appointments in the Marine Hospital Service of the United States is signed by President Grover Cleveland. It establishes a Commissioned Corps of officers as a predecessor to the current U.S. Public Health Service Commissioned Corps.
 January 15 – The Coca-Cola Company, at this time known as the Pemberton Medicine Company, is incorporated in Atlanta, Georgia.
 January 22 – Columbia Phonograph is formed in Washington, DC.
 February 15 – The Secretary of Agriculture is raised to a Cabinet-level position.
 February 22 – President Grover Cleveland signs the Enabling Act admitting North Dakota, South Dakota, Montana and Washington as U.S. states.
 March – A German naval force shells a village in Samoa, destroying some American property; three American warships enter the Samoan harbor and prepare to fire on the three German warships found there. Before guns are fired, a hurricane blows in and sinks all the ships, American and German. A compulsory armistice is called because of the lack of warships.
 March 2 – Congress proclaims the entire Bering Sea, an important seal breeding area, to be under US control.
 March 4 – Benjamin Harrison is sworn in as the 23rd President of the United States, and Levi P. Morton is sworn in as Vice President of the United States.
 March 11 
The North Carolina Legislature issues a charter for the creation of Elon College.
Orange County, California is created.

April–June
 April 22 – At high noon in Oklahoma Territory, thousands rush to claim land in the Land Rush of 1889. Within hours the cities of Oklahoma City and Guthrie are formed, with populations of at least 10,000.
 May 15 – In Samoa, 3 U.S. and 3 German ships sink in a typhoon because the captains refuse to leave before the others; almost 200 drown. The British steamer Calliope saves itself by pushing into the wind with full speed.
 May 19 – The first  mass at ICC, Greene, New York, by Father Mahon.
 May 30 – A tornado crossing West Virginia kills two.
 May 31 – Johnstown Flood: The South Fork Dam collapses in western Pennsylvania, killing more than 2,200 people in and around Johnstown, Pennsylvania.
 June 3 – The first long distance electric power transmission line in the United States is completed, running 14 miles between a generator at Willamette Falls and downtown Portland, Oregon.
 June 6 – The Great Seattle Fire ravages through the downtown area without any fatalities.

July–September
 July 7 – Great Bakersfield Fire of 1889 devastates Bakersfield, California, destroying 196 buildings and killing one person.
 July 8
 The first issue of The Wall Street Journal is published in New York City.
 The last official bare-knuckle boxing title fight ever held as Heavyweight Champion John L. Sullivan, the "Boston Strong Boy", defeats Jake Kilrain in a world championship bout lasting 75 rounds in Mississippi.
 August 1 – The New Hampshire Legislature issues a charter for incorporation of the Order of Saint Benedict of New Hampshire, foundation of Saint Anselm College.
 September 18 – The influential Hull House settlement house opens in Chicago.
September - Sherman Day Thacher opens The Thacher School, one of America’s oldest and most unique boarding high schools, to a small group of students in the mountains of Ojai, California.

October–December
 October 2 – The first International Conference of American States begins in Washington, D.C.
 November 2 – North Dakota and South Dakota become the 39th and 40th states, respectively (see History of North Dakota) and (see History of South Dakota).
 November 8 – Montana becomes the 41st state (see History of Montana).
 November 11 – Washington becomes the 42nd state (see History of Washington (state)).
 November 14 – Pioneer woman journalist Nellie Bly (Elizabeth Cochrane) begins an attempt to beat travel around the world in less than 80 days, inspired by Jules Verne (Bly finishes the journey in 72 days, 6 hours and 11 minutes).
 November 23 – The first jukebox goes into operation at the Palais Royale Saloon in San Francisco.
 November 27 – Clemson University is founded in Clemson, South Carolina.
 December 14 – Wofford and Furman play the first intercollegiate American football game in the state of South Carolina.
 December 1–31 – With  of rainfall, Los Angeles has its wettest calendar month since records began in 1877.

Undated
 Brook trout are introduced into the upper Firehole River, Yellowstone National Park.
 Riverside Elementary School (Wichita, Kansas) is established.
 Valentine-Seaver Company, a furniture manufacturer is co-founded in Chicago.
 Herman Hollerith invents the first electric counting machine for the 1890 census.

Ongoing
 Gilded Age (1869–c. 1896)

Sport 
October 29 – The New York Giants win their second consecutive World Series title by beating the Brooklyn Bridegrooms, 3–2, for their fifth straight win in taking the series 6 games to 3.
November 30 - Princeton wins the Consensus College Football National Championship

Births
 January 1 – Charles Bickford, actor (died 1967)
 January 2 – Walter Baldwin, character actor (died 1977)
 January 11 – Calvin Bridges, geneticist (died 1938)
 January 20 – Allan Lockheed, aviation pioneer and engineer (died 1969)
 February 23 – Victor Fleming, film director, cinematographer, and producer (died 1949)
 February 23 – John Gilbert Winant, American politician (died 1949)
 February 25 – Homer S. Ferguson, U.S. Senator from Michigan from 1943 to 1955 (died 1982)
 March 4 – Oren E. Long, U.S. Senator from Hawaii from 1959 to 1963 (died 1965)
 March 8 – Oscar R. Ewing, lawyer, politician, and social reformer (died 1980)
 March 21 – Frederick Osborn, philanthropist and eugenicist (died 1981)
 April 15 – A. Philip Randolph, African American labor union leader (died 1979)
 April 21
A. J. Balaban, Russian-American businessman, co-founded Balaban and Katz (died 1962)
Walter Costello, gangster (died 1917)
S. W. Harrington, American football player, coach, and physician (died 1975)
 May 4 – Francis Spellman, sixth Archbishop of New York from 1939 to 1967 (died 1937)
 May 18 – Thomas Midgley Jr., mechanical and chemical engineer (died 1944)
 May 20 – Felix Arndt, pianist and composer (died 1918)
 June 1 – James Daugherty, author, illustrator, and painter (died 1974)
 June 4 – James O. McKinsey, accountant and pioneer of management consulting (died 1937)
 June 18 – Prentiss M. Brown, U.S. Senator from Michigan from 1936 to 1943 (died 1973)
 July 29 – Vladimir Kosma Zworykin, Russian-American physicist (died 1982)
 August 11 – Ross T. McIntire, naval surgeon (died 1960)
 November 19 – Clifton Webb, actor, dancer and singer (died 1966)
 November 20 – Edwin Hubble, astronomer (died 1953)

Deaths
 January 13 – Solomon Bundy, politician (born 1823)
 February 3 – Belle Starr, outlaw (born 1848)
 February 11 – Henry Jackson Hunt, Chief of Artillery in the Army of the Potomac during the American Civil War (born 1819)
 March 8 – John Ericsson, mechanical engineer and inventor (born 1803 in Sweden)
 March 14 – Adonijah Welch, U.S. Senator from Florida from 1868 to 1869 (born 1821)
 March 15 – Melville Reuben Bissell, entrepreneur, inventor of the Carpet sweeper (born 1843)
 April 30 – William Henry Barnum, U.S. Senator from Connecticut from 1876 to 1879 (born 1818)
 May 9 – William S. Harney, general (born 1800)
 June 26
 Simon Cameron, journalist, editor and 26th United States Secretary of War from 1861 to 1862 (born 1799)
 Lucy Hayes, First Lady of the United States as wife of Rutherford B. Hayes (born 1831)
 July 10 – Joseph Projectus Machebeuf, French-American Catholic missionary and first Bishop of Denver (born 1812)
 September 16 – Bob Younger, outlaw (born 1853)
 November 24 – George H. Pendleton, politician (born 1825)
 December 6 – Jefferson Davis, only President of the Confederate States of America from 1861 to 1865 and U.S. Senator from Mississippi from 1847 to 1851 and from 1857 to 1861 (born 1808)

See also
Timeline of United States history (1860–1899)

References

External links
 

 
1880s in the United States
United States
United States
Years of the 19th century in the United States